Coocoochee (c. 1740 – after 1800) was a Mohawk leader and medicine woman. She was born in a village near Montreal but lived most of her life in the remote North American Ohio Country among the Shawnee led by the war chief Blue Jacket. She was born into the important Wolf Clan, later marrying a warrior member of the Bear Clan. Among the Shawnee she was renowned for her acquired skills as a healer with special expertise in preparing and using herbal medicines. She was also revered for her ability to contact the powerful world of spirit. In addition to her role as healer, she was often consulted on military and political matters involving Indian/American relations. 

Inter-colonial warfare broke out during Coocoochee's teenage years. Shawnee battles along the Ohio River made their way north, eventually reaching Coocoochee's Native Montreal village. Due to the wars her family, including the two toddler aged children her and her husband had at the time of the wars, walked 700 miles to their new home in central Ohio where they remained until she died. 

From 1769 to 1777, Coocoochee and her family lived among the Shawnee in Ohio. In Ohio they lived on the west bank of the Scioto River in a town led by Blue Jacket, a Shawnee war chief.

Family
Sometime between 1754 and 1763 Coocoochee married a Mohawk warrior named Cokundiawsaw. During this time, before leaving for Ohio, they had four children: one daughter and three sons.

Further reading

References

American Mohawk people
Indigenous American traditional healers
18th-century Native Americans
Native Americans of the Northwest Indian War